Said Azimshah Garibzada ( born in Kabul on 5 May 1957) is an Afghan-born former football player and trainer. In 1980, he moved to Germany as a refugee and lived many years in Paderborn. He now lives in Germany.

National Team Career 
He made his senior national team debut in 1976 Qaed Azam's Centenary International Football Tournament, hosted by Pakistan. He also was a member of the Afghanistan under-20 national football team and took part in the 1977 AFC Youth Championship hosted by Iran. He also took part in the 1980 Asian Cup Qualifying Tournament and AGA Khan Gold Cup in Bangladesh.

References 

Afghan footballers
Afghan expatriate footballers
Afghanistan international footballers
Living people
1957 births
Footballers from Kabul
Association football midfielders